Events from the year 1680 in art.

Events
Following the death of Sir Peter Lely, Godfrey Kneller is appointed Principal Painter to the Crown by King Charles II of England.

Paintings

Pedro Nuñez de Villavicencio - Fallen Apple Basket (Museum of Fine Arts (Budapest))
Godfrey Kneller - Black Page Boy (Charlecote Park, England)
Gerard ter Borch - Young Man Reading a Book (approximate date)

Births
January 3 - Johann Baptist Zimmermann, German painter and stucco plasterer (died 1758)
March 23 - Juan Ramírez Mejandre, Spanish Baroque sculptor (died 1739)
date unknown
Juan Antonio García de Bouzas, Spanish painter of the Baroque period (died 1755)
Francisco Bustamante, Spanish painter (died 1737)
Leonardo Coccorante, Italian painter especially of large, highly detailed landscapes with imaginary classical architectural ruins (died 1750)
Lorenzo De Ferrari, Italian painter (died 1744)
Giuseppe Gambarini, Italian painter of frescoes (died 1725)
Carlo Antonio Rambaldi, Italian painter of the Baroque period (died 1717)
Girolamo Rossi, Italian engraver of the late-Baroque (d. unknown)
Carlo Salis, Italian painter, born in Verona (died 1763)
Pier Lorenzo Spoleti, Italian painter of portrait painting and reproductions of master paintings (died 1726)
Maria Verelst, Dutch miniature and portrait painter (died 1744)
Candido Vitali, Italian painter of still lifes of animals, birds, flower, and fruit (died 1753)
probable
Maurice Baquoy, French engraver (died 1747)
Francesco Boccaccino, Italian painter, born at Cremona (died 1750)
Domenico Bocciardo, Italian painter, active in Genoa (died 1746)
Charles Collins, Irish painter primarily of animals and still-life (died 1744)
Sebastiano Conca, Italian painter (died 1764)
Jean-Baptiste Gilles,  French painter of portraits in miniature and water-colours (died 1762)
Gaetano Martoriello, Italian painter of marine vedute and landscapes (died 1733)

Deaths
February – Willem Drost, Netherlands painter (born 1630)
August 24 – Ferdinand Bol, Dutch artist, etcher, and draftsman (born 1616)
October 4 – Jacobus Mancadan, Dutch Golden Age painter mostly known for his pastoral landscapes (born 1602)
November 28
Gian Lorenzo Bernini, Italian sculptor/architect/painter (born 1598)
Giovanni Francesco Grimaldi, Italian architect and painter (born 1606)
November 30 – Sir Peter Lely, English painter (born 1618)
date unknown
Juan de Alfaro y Gamez, Spanish painter of the Baroque (born 1643)
Nicolas Baudesson, French flower painter (born 1611)
Girolamo Bonini, Italian painter, active mainly in Bologna (born unknown)
Hendrick Danckerts, Dutch painter and engraver (born 1625)
Angelo Everardi, Italian painter of battle scenes (born 1647)
Adriano Palladino, Italian painter born and active in Cortona (born 1610)
Francesco Quaini, Italian painter of quadratura (born 1611)
Luigi Pellegrini Scaramuccia, Italian painter and artist biographer (born 1616)
Wang Shimin – Chinese landscape painter during the Ch'ing Dynasty (born 1592)
probable
Willem Claeszoon Heda, Dutch still life painter (born 1594)
Giovanni Fulco, Italian painter excelling particularly in the representation of children (born 1615)

 
Years of the 17th century in art
1680s in art